Charles Houghton Mills (1843 – 3 April 1923) was a member of parliament for Waimea and Wairau, in the South Island of New Zealand.

Early life
Mills was born in Nelson. His father was Richard Mills, who arrived in Nelson in 1841 on the Lord Auckland. The family moved to Wellington in the early 1850s, where his father was Governor of the gaol, and where Charles Mills was educated. He was a pupil teacher at Te Aro school. He went to sea for some years, and then worked in mining and farming. Later, Mills was a commission agent.

Mills settled in Havelock in 1871 and married Margaret, a daughter of John Morrison, in the same year.

Member of Parliament

The 1887 general election in the Waimea-Picton electorate was contested by Arthur Seymour, Joseph Harkness and Mills, who received 446, 444 and 415 votes, respectively. Seymour was thus elected.

The 1890 general election in the Waimea-Picton electorate was contested by Mills, Richmond Hursthouse and William Henry Phillips, who received 936, 728 and 80 votes, respectively. Mills was thus elected and represented the electorate until the end of the term in 1893. The 1896 general election was contested by the incumbent Lindsay Buick and Mills, who received 2014 and 2072 votes, respectively. Mills thus succeeded Buick in Wairau.

Mills served as the Liberal Party's Senior Whip from 1894 until his elevation to cabinet in 1900. He was Minister of Trade and Customs between 1900 and 1906 and Minister of Immigration in 1906.

He was a member of the Provincial Council and Marlborough County Council, and of the Legislative Council between 1909 and 1916.

Death
Mills died on 3 April 1923 and was buried at Omaka Cemetery, Blenheim. He was survived by his wife.

Notes

References

Dictionary of New Zealand Biography edited by Guy H. Scholefield vol. 2 pp. 84,85 (2 volumes 1940, Department of Internal Affairs)

1843 births
1923 deaths
Members of the Cabinet of New Zealand
Members of the New Zealand Legislative Council
Members of the Marlborough Provincial Council
New Zealand Liberal Party MPs
New Zealand businesspeople
People from Nelson, New Zealand
New Zealand Liberal Party MLCs
New Zealand MPs for South Island electorates
Members of the New Zealand House of Representatives
Unsuccessful candidates in the 1887 New Zealand general election
Burials at Omaka Cemetery
19th-century New Zealand politicians